Twelve Trio Sonatas, Op. 1 is the first collection of musics composed by Antonio Vivaldi, and  published by the Venetian publisher Giuseppe Sala in 1705, the first edition is believed to have been published around 1703. These sonatas are for two violins and basso continuo. The last music is a same title of "La Follia" as Corelli's Twelve Violin Sonatas, Op. 5.

Sonata No. 1 in G minor, RV 73
Sonata No. 2 in E minor, RV 67
Sonata No. 3 in C major, RV 61
Sonata No. 4 in E major, RV 66
Sonata No. 5 in F major, RV 69
Sonata No. 6 in D major, RV 62
Sonata No. 7 in E-flat major, RV 65
Sonata No. 8 in D minor, RV 64
Sonata No. 9 in A major, RV 75
Sonata No. 10 in B-flat major, RV 78
Sonata No. 11 in B minor, RV 79
Sonata No. 12 in D minor "La Follia", RV 63

The final sonata is a set of variations on the famous "Folia" theme.

References

External links

Performance of Trio Sonata No. 12 ("La Follia") by the Chamber Music Society of Lincoln Center from the Isabella Stewart Gardner Museum in MP3 format

Compositions by Antonio Vivaldi
1705 compositions